Eriophorum scheuchzeri is a species of flowering plant in the sedge family known by the common names Scheuchzer's cottongrass and white cottongrass. It has an arctic circumpolar and circumboreal distribution in the Northern Hemisphere. It can be found in Alaska, across Canada, in the Arctic islands, Greenland, Iceland, and across Eurasia. Disjunct occurrences exist in the Rocky Mountains, in the high mountains of southern Europe (the Pyrenees, Alps, and the Caucasus) and on Mount Daisetsu in Japan and some other Asian mountains.

Description
This species is a perennial herb producing colonies via its rhizomes. Leaves at the top of the stem have no blades, just black-tipped sheaths.

Distribution and habitat
It is a helophyte. It is restricted to wet habitat types, and grows in marshes and wet meadows, by ponds and lakes, and on riverbanks, in moist and wet gravel and sand substrates. It often lines the edges of standing water bodies commonly associated with mosses and other sedges, such as Carex aquatilis.

Uses
Native and indigenous peoples have long been familiar with the plant and its uses. The Inuit have at least three names for Scheuchzer's cottongrass: pualunnguat, meaning "imitation mittens"; kumaksiutinnguat, meaning "an imitation object to remove lice"; and in North Baffin, kanguujat, meaning "what looks like snow geese". It has been used as lamp wicks,  boot insoles, and swabs. The cottony flowers have been used as dressings to absorb wound drainage. The plant is also edible and sweet-tasting.

This plant is consumed by muskoxen. Waterfowl feed on the seeds.

References

scheuchzeri
Plants described in 1800
Taxa named by David Heinrich Hoppe